Pale Blue Dot is a photograph of planet Earth taken on February 14, 1990, by the Voyager 1 space probe from a record distance of about  kilometers ( miles, 40.5 AU), as part of that day's Family Portrait series of images of the Solar System.

In the photograph, Earth's apparent size is less than a pixel; the planet appears as a tiny dot against the vastness of space, among bands of sunlight reflected by the camera.

Voyager 1, which had completed its primary mission and was leaving the Solar System, was commanded by NASA to turn its camera around and take one last photograph of Earth across a great expanse of space, at the request of astronomer and author Carl Sagan. The phrase "Pale Blue Dot" was coined by Sagan in his reflections on the photograph's significance, documented in his 1994 book of the same name.

Background 
In September 1977, NASA launched Voyager 1, a  robotic spacecraft on a mission to study the outer Solar System and eventually interstellar space. After the encounter with the Jovian system in 1979 and the Saturnian system in 1980, the primary mission was declared complete in November of the same year. Voyager 1 was the first space probe to provide detailed images of the two largest planets and their major moons.

Its mission has been extended and continues to this day, with the aim of investigating the boundaries of the Solar System, including the Kuiper belt, the heliosphere and interstellar space.

Voyager 1 was expected to work only through the Saturn encounter. When the spacecraft passed the planet in 1980, Sagan proposed the idea of the space probe taking one last picture of Earth. He acknowledged that such a picture would not have had much scientific value, as the Earth would appear too small for Voyagers cameras to make out any detail, but it would be meaningful as a perspective on humanity's place in the universe.

Although many in NASA's Voyager program were supportive of the idea, there were concerns that taking a picture of Earth so close to the Sun risked damaging the spacecraft's imaging system irreparably. It was not until 1989 that Sagan's idea was put in motion, but then instrument calibrations delayed the operation further, and the personnel who devised and transmitted the radio commands to Voyager 1 were also being laid off or transferred to other projects. Finally, NASA Administrator Richard Truly interceded to ensure that the photograph was taken. A proposal to continue to photograph Earth as it orbited the Sun was rejected.

Camera 
Voyager 1s Imaging Science Subsystem (ISS) consists of two cameras: a 200 mm focal length, low-resolution wide-angle camera (WA), used for spatially extended imaging, and a 1500 mm high-resolution narrow-angle camera (NA) – the one that took Pale Blue Dot – intended for detailed imaging of specific targets. Both cameras are of the slow-scan vidicon tube type and were fitted with eight colored filters, mounted on a filter wheel placed in front of the tube.

The challenge was that, as the mission progressed, the objects to be photographed would increasingly be farther away and would appear fainter, requiring longer exposures and slewing (panning) of the cameras to achieve acceptable quality. The telecommunication capability also diminished with distance, limiting the number of data modes that could be used by the imaging system.

After taking the Family Portrait series of images, which included Pale Blue Dot, NASA mission managers commanded Voyager 1 to power its cameras down, as the spacecraft was not going to fly near anything else of significance for the rest of its mission, while other instruments that were still collecting data needed power for the long journey to interstellar space.

Photograph 

The design of the command sequence to be relayed to the spacecraft and the calculations for each photograph's exposure time were developed by space scientists Candy Hansen of NASA's Jet Propulsion Laboratory and Carolyn Porco of the University of Arizona. The command sequence was then compiled and sent to Voyager 1, with the images taken at 04:48 GMT on February 14, 1990. At that time, the distance between the spacecraft and Earth was 40.47 astronomical units (6,055 million kilometers, 3,762 million miles).

The data from the camera was stored initially in an on-board tape recorder. Transmission to Earth was also delayed by the Magellan and Galileo missions being given priority use of the Deep Space Network. Then, between March and May 1990, Voyager 1 returned 60 frames back to Earth, with the radio signal travelling at the speed of light for nearly five and a half hours to cover the distance.

Three of the frames received showed the Earth as a tiny point of light in empty space. Each frame had been taken using a different color filter: blue, green and violet, with exposure times of 0.72, 0.48 and 0.72 seconds respectively. The three frames were then recombined to produce the image that became Pale Blue Dot.

Of the 640,000 individual pixels that compose each frame, Earth takes up less than one (0.12 of a pixel, according to NASA). The light bands across the photograph are an artifact, the result of sunlight reflecting off parts of the camera and its sunshade, due to the relative proximity between the Sun and the Earth. Voyager's point of view was approximately 32° above the ecliptic. Detailed analysis suggested that the camera also detected the Moon, although it is too faint to be visible without special processing.

Pale Blue Dot, which was taken with the narrow-angle camera, was also published as part of a composite picture created from a wide-angle camera photograph showing the Sun and the region of space containing the Earth and Venus. The wide-angle image was inset with two narrow-angle pictures: Pale Blue Dot and a similar photograph of Venus. The wide-angle photograph was taken with the darkest filter (a methane absorption band) and the shortest possible exposure (5 milliseconds), to avoid saturating the camera's vidicon tube with scattered sunlight. Even so, the result was a bright burned-out image with multiple reflections from the optics in the camera and the Sun that appears far larger than the actual dimension of the solar disk. The rays around the Sun are a diffraction pattern of the calibration lamp which is mounted in front of the wide-angle lens.

Pale blue color 
Earth appears as a blue dot in the photograph primarily because of Rayleigh scattering of sunlight in its atmosphere. In Earth's air, short-wavelength visible light such as blue light is scattered to a greater extent than longer wavelength light such as red light, which is the reason why the sky appears blue from Earth. (The ocean also contributes to Earth's blueness, but to a lesser degree than scattering.) Earth is a pale blue dot, rather than dark blue, because white light reflected by clouds combines with the scattered blue light.

Earth's reflectance spectrum from the far-ultraviolet to the near-infrared is unlike that of any other observed planet and is partially due to the presence of life on Earth. Rayleigh scattering, which causes Earth's blueness, is enhanced in an atmosphere that does not substantially absorb visible light, unlike, for example, the orange-brown color of Titan, where organic haze particles absorb strongly at blue visible wavelengths. Earth's plentiful atmospheric oxygen, which is produced by photosynthetic life forms, causes the atmosphere to be transparent to visible light, which allows for substantial Rayleigh scattering and hence stronger reflectance of blue light.

Reflections 
In his 1994 book, Pale Blue Dot, Carl Sagan comments on what he sees as the greater significance of the photograph, writing:

Anniversaries 

In 2015, NASA acknowledged the 25th anniversary of the photograph. Ed Stone, Voyager project scientist, commented: "Twenty-five years ago, Voyager 1 looked back toward Earth and saw a "pale blue dot", an image that continues to inspire wonderment about the spot we call home."

In 2020, for the image's 30th anniversary, NASA published a new version of the original Voyager photo: Pale Blue Dot Revisited, obtained using modern image processing techniques "while attempting to respect the original data and intent of those who planned the images." Brightness levels and colors were rebalanced to enhance the area containing the Earth, and the image was enlarged, appearing brighter and less grainy than the original. The direction of the Sun is toward the bottom, where the image is brightest.

To celebrate the same occasion, the Carl Sagan Institute released a video with several noted astronomers reciting Sagan's "Pale Blue Dot" speech.

See also 

 Earthrise
 The Blue Marble
 2010 Family Portrait
 First images of Earth from space
 The Day the Earth Smiled
 Space selfie
 Early Earth, or "pale orange dot"
 Bluedot Festival
 Overview effect

References

Further reading

External links 

 Audio recording of Carl Sagan reading from Pale Blue Dot (US Library of Congress)
 Sagan's rationale for human spaceflight – Article on The Space Review
 Video produced for Pangea Day with Sagan reading from Pale Blue Dot
 
 

Photographs of Earth from outer space
Voyager program
1990 works
1990 in art
1990s photographs
February 1990 events
Color photographs